Pareuchelus lecointreae is an extinct species of sea snail, a marine gastropod mollusk, in the family Liotiidae.

Distribution
This species occurs in France.

References

 Landau B.M., Van Dingenen F. & Ceulemans L. (2017). The upper Miocene gastropods of northwestern France, 1. Patellogastropoda and Vetigastropoda. Cainozoic Research. 17(2): 75-166.

Liotiidae